Nur Alam (born 9 July 1967) is a former Governor of South East Sulawesi. He was inaugurated for his first five-year term in 2008, and for his second in 2013.

The inauguration of Alam's second term proved controversial. Student groups protested due to Alam's implication in a graft case by the Corruption Eradication Commission, though the Supreme Court of Indonesia upheld the victory when Alam's election rival filed a legal challenge. Formal graft accusations by the Commission in 2017 eventually led Home Affairs Minister Tjahjo Kumolo to promote Alam's deputy Saleh Lasata to acting governor in July that year.

He was sentenced by the Jakarta Corruption Court in April 2018 to 12 years in prison, with official estimated losses of the state at Rp 1.5 trillion.

References

External links
Official biography in Indonesian (machine translation)

1967 births
Governors of Southeast Sulawesi
Living people
National Mandate Party politicians
Indonesian politicians convicted of corruption